Soft City is the first book written by Jonathan Raban, and published by Hamish Hamilton (UK) and E. P. Dutton & Company (US) in 1974.

Synopsis
Soft City records one man's attempt to plot a course through the urban labyrinth. Holding up a revealing mirror to the modern city, it is used as the locale for a demanding and expressive personal drama.

Jonathan Raban’s soft city is the malleable material from which identity is formed. “It
Decide who
you are, and the city will again assume a fixed form around you.” This soft city is the
mythic city, where illusion, dream, aspiration, and nightmare are all fixed into place; it
comes into focus as it is passed through and acted upon by an individual or a collective. 
Where is the ‘Soft City” now? – Feb 2007
Introduced by Tim Waterman
Hosted by Andrew Stuck, Rethinking Cities Ltd.

1974 books
Hamish Hamilton books
E. P. Dutton books